The Roman Catholic Diocese of Rutabo was a short-lived (1951–1960) bishopric in Tanzania and is now a Latin Catholic titular see.

History 
 It was established on 13 December 1951 as Apostolic Vicariate of Lower Kagera, on territory split off from the then Apostolic Vicariate of Bubuka.
 Promoted and renamed after its see city on 25 March 1953 as the Diocese of Rutabo, a suffragan of the Metropolitan Archdiocese of Mwanza (also in Tanzania).
 Suppressed on 21 June 1960, its territory being used to establish the Diocese of Bukoba.

Ordinary 
Apostolic Vicar of Lower Kagera
 Laurean Rugambwa (1951.12.13 – 1953.03.25 see below), Titular Bishop of Febiana (1951.12.13 – 1953.03.25)

Suffragan Bishop of Rutabo
 Laurean Rugambwa (see above 1953.03.25 – see suppressed 1960.06.21); later created Cardinal-Priest of S. Francesco d’Assisi a Ripa Grande (1960.03.31 – 1997.12.08), Bishop of Bukoba (Tanzania) (1960.06.21 – 1968.12.19), Metropolitan Archbishop of Dar-es-Salaam (Tanzania) (1968.12.19 – 1992.07.22), President of Association of Member Episcopal Conferences in Eastern Africa (1970 – 1974)

Titular see 
It was nominally restored in January 2009 as a Latin titular bishopric.

It has had the following incumbent, of the fitting Episcopal (lowest) rank :
 Telesphore Bilung, Divine Word Missionaries (S.V.D.) (2014.05.06 – ...), Auxiliary Bishop of Ranchi (India) (2014.05.06 – ...)

Sources and external links 
 GCatholic, with Google satellite photo

Catholic titular sees in Africa
Suppressed Roman Catholic dioceses